Dune 2 may refer to:

 Dune Messiah, a science fiction novel, second in the Dune series
 Dune II, a science fiction video game
 Dune: Part Two, an American film and sequel to the 2021 film Dune